Cea is the surname of:

 Edmundo B. Cea (1911–1993), Filipino politician
 Eusebio Rodolfo Cordón Cea (1899–1966), provisional president of El Salvador in 1962
 Jean Céa (born 1932), French mathematician
 José Pedro Cea (1900–1970), Uruguayan footballer
 José Roberto Cea (born 1939), Salvadoran novelist and poet
 Ricardo Mella Cea (1861–1925), Spanish writer, intellectual and anarchist activist
 Severo Cea, Filipino politician

See also
 Zea (surname)